Clara or Klara is a female given name. It is the feminine form of the Late Latin name Clarus which meant "clear, bright, famous". Various early male Christian saints were named Clarus; the feminine form became popular after the 13th-century Saint Clare of Assisi (called Chiara in Italian), one of the followers of Saint Francis, who renounced her privileged background and founded the order of Poor Clares.

Clare was the main English form of the name used in the Middle Ages, but the Latin spelling Clara became more popular in the 19th century.

Glara is a related Kurdish name with a common origin, meaning "vision or brightness".

People with this name

Given name
Clara Alm (born 1996), Swedish footballer 
Clara Amfo (born 1984), British broadcaster and presenter
Clara Arthur (1858–1929), American suffragist
 Clara Ayres (1880–1917), American nurse during the First World War
 Clara Barton (1821–1912), pioneer American teacher, nurse and humanitarian
 Clara Doty Bates (1838–1895), American author 
 Clara Nettie Bates (1876-1966), American editor, writer, clubwoman
 Clara Bancroft Beatley (1858-1923), American educator, lecturer, author
 Clara Beyers (1880–1950), American actress
 Clara Bindi (born 1927), Italian actress
 Clara Blandick (1876–1962), American actress
 Clara Bonde (1806–1899), Swedish courtier and royal favourite
 Clara Bow (1905–1965), American actress
 Clara Louise Burnham (1854–1927), American novelist
 Clara Butt (1872–1936), English contralto
 Clara Germana Cele, South African woman stated in 1906 to have suffered demonic possession
 Clara Marguerite Christian (1895–1964), first black woman to study at the University of Edinburgh
 Clara Chung (born 1987), Korean-American singer/guitarist also known by her stage name, Clara C
 Clara Rankin Coblentz (1863-1933), American social reformer
 Clara Eliot (1896–1976), economist
 Clara Shortridge Foltz (1849-1934), first female attorney on the Pacific Coast, suffrage leader, founder of the public defender movement 
 Clara Grima (born 1971), Spanish mathematician
 Clara Haskil (1895–1960), Romanian classical pianist, renowned as an interpreter of the classical and early romantic repertoire
 Clara H. Hazelrigg (1861–1937), American author, educator and social reformer 
 Clara Horton (1904–1976), American actress
 Clara Hughes (born 1972), Canadian athlete who has won medals in both the summer and winter Olympics
 Clara Immerwahr (1870–1915), German chemist, first wife of Fritz Haber
 Clara Landsberg (1873–1966), American educator
 Clara Lee (born 1985; real name Lee Sung-min), South Korean actress
 Clara Lemlich (1886–1982), union organizer, consumer activist, member of the Communist Party
 Clara Luper (1923–2011), American civil rights leader
 Clara Maniu (1842–1929), Romanian feminist
 Clara Morgane (born 1981), French porn star and singer
 Clara Mulholland (1849–1934), Irish writer
 Clara Ng (born 1973), Indonesian writer
 Klara Izabella Pacowa (1631–1685), politically active Polish court official 
 Clara Paget (born 1988), British model and actress
 Clara Petacci (1912–1945), mistress of Benito Mussolini
 Clara Rockmore (1911–1998), Lithuanian virtuosa of the theremin
 Clara Schønfeld (1856–1938), Danish actress
 Clara Schumann (1819–1896), German pianist, composer
 Clara Sosa (born 1993), Paraguayan model, television personality and beauty queen 
 Clara Harrison Stranahan (1831–1905), American author, college founder 
 Clara Tott (1440–1520), German singer
 Clara Augusta Jones Trask (1839–1805), American writer 	
 Clara Ursin (1828–1890), Norwegian (originally Danish) stage actress and opera singer
Clara Belle Williams (1885–1994), first African-American graduate of New Mexico State University
Clara Weekes (1852-1937), Australian educator, suffragist, labor leader and pacifist
 Clara Kimball Young (1890–1960), American actress
 Clara Zetkin (1857–1933), German Marxist theorist and women's rights activist
 Clara Tang (born 1998), English teacher and poet, author of the bestselling novel, "Seasons of Life"

Surname
 Aemilia Clara, Roman woman who lived in the 2nd century
 Didia Clara (born about 153), only child of the Roman Emperor Didius Julianus and Empress Manlia Scantilla

Animals with this name
Clara the Rhinoceros, female Indian rhinoceros who became famous during 17 years of touring Europe in the mid-18th century
Clara the Cow, live mascot in Greek Mega Channel's entertainment programme Poly tin Kyriaki (Too Much on Sunday)

Fictional characters
 Clara, the protagonist in Tchaikovsky's classic ballet The Nutcracker
 Clara in Bob Dylan's 1975 surrealist film Renaldo and Clara
 Clara in E. T. A. Hoffmann's short story "The Sandman"
 Aunt Clara, minor character in the 1960s television series Bewitched
 Princess Clara, character in the American animated television series Drawn Together
 Clara, protagonist in Elizabeth Spencer's novella The Light in the Piazza and in the book's film and musical adaptation
 Clara, the main antagonist in the 1972 animated film Snoopy Come Home
 Clara Belle in the video game MySims
 Clara Brereton, impoverished niece of Lady Denham in Jane Austen’s unfinished novel Sanditon (1817)
 Clara Clayton, wife of Doc Brown in the Back to the Future film series 
 Clara Cluck, recurring character in Disney's Mickey Mouse cartoons
 Clara de Clare, rich woman who becomes a nun in Walter Scott's Marmion
 María Clara de los Santos, heroine of the novel Noli Me Tángere
 Clara Durrant in Virginia Woolf's novel Jacob's Room 
 Clara Oswald, companion of the Eleventh and Twelfth Doctor in the British sci-fi television series Doctor Who
 Clara Sesemann, the invalid friend in Johanna Spyri's Heidi
 Clara del Valle Trueba, the clairvoyant key female figure of Isabel Allende's first novel, The House of the Spirits
 Clara Yotsuba, main character in Glitter Force Doki Doki (originally named Alice Yotsuba)

See also

Chara (given name)
Clara (disambiguation)
Clare (given name)
Claire (given name)

References

Latin feminine given names
French feminine given names
English feminine given names
Danish feminine given names
Romanian feminine given names
Scandinavian feminine given names